Columbia City is a city in Columbia Township, Whitley County, in the U.S. state of Indiana. The population was 9,892 (2020 Census), growing by 13% since the 2010 Census. The city is the county seat of Whitley County.

History

The Whitley County Courthouse was designed (1888–1891) by Brentwood S. Tolan, of Fort Wayne, Indiana. The building was added to the National Register of Historic Places in 1979. The Thomas R. Marshall House was added to the register in 1983 and the Columbia City Historic District was added in 1987.

Geography
Columbia City is located at  (41.158569, -85.487784).

Demographics

2010 census
As of the census of 2010, there were 8,750 people, 3,658 households, and 2,235 families residing in the city. The racial makeup of the city was 96.7% White, 0.5% African American, 0.3% Native American, 0.5% Asian, 0.6% from other races, and 1.4% from two or more races. Hispanic or Latino of any race were 2.2% of the population.

There were 3,658 households, of which 30.9% had children under the age of 18 living with them, 42.4% were married couples living together, 13.9% had a female householder with no husband present, 4.8% had a male householder with no wife present, and 38.9% were non-families. 33.5% of all households were made up of individuals, and 14.2% had someone living alone who was 65 years of age or older. The average household size was 2.32 and the average family size was 2.93.

The median age in the city was 36.1 years. 24.9% of residents were under the age of 18; 9.1% were between the ages of 18 and 24; 26.7% were from 25 to 44; 23.9% were from 45 to 64; and 15.3% were 65 years of age or older. The gender makeup of the city was 47.6% male and 52.4% female.

2000 census
As of the census of 2000, there were 7,077 people, 3,018 households, and 1,874 residing in the city. The racial makeup of the city was 98.11% White, 0.32% African American, 0.44% Native American, 0.08% Asian, 0.03% Pacific Islander, 0.34% from other races, and 0.68% from two or more races. Hispanic or Latino of any race were 1.20% of the population.

There were 3,018 households, out of which 30.6% had children under the age of 18 living with them, 45.8% were married couples living together, 12.4% had a female householder with no husband present, and 37.9% were non-families. 33.6% of all households were made up of individuals, and 15.1% had someone living alone who was 65 years of age or older. The average household size was 2.27 and the average family size was 2.89.

In the city, the population was spread out, with 24.4% under the age of 18, 9.9% from 18 to 24, 29.1% from 25 to 44, 18.8% from 45 to 64, and 17.7% who were 65 years of age or older. The median age was 36 years. For every 100 females, there were 89.2 males. For every 100 females age 18 and over, there were 85.8 males.

The median income for a household in the city was $36,112, and the median income for a family was $47,357. Males had a median income of $34,803 versus $21,740 for females. The per capita income for the city was $19,296. About 4.5% of families and 6.4% of the population were below the poverty line, including 5.8% of those under age 18 and 9.8% of those age 65 or over.

Government
The city government consists of a mayor and a five-member city council. The mayor is elected in a citywide vote, along with the city councilperson-at-large. The remaining four council members are elected from individual city districts: northeast, southeast, southwest and northwest. There is also a city clerk-treasurer who is elected in a citywide vote.

The Columbia City post office has been in operation since 1854.

Education
 Columbia City High School
Eagle Tech Academy
 Indian Springs Middle School
Mary Raber Elementary School
Little Turtle Elementary School
Northern Heights Elementary School
Coesse Elementary School
Faith Christian Academy

The town has a lending library, the Peabody Public Library.

References

External links

 City of Columbia City, Indiana website
 Columbia City Chamber of Commerce
 Whitley County Official Website
 

Cities in Indiana
Cities in Whitley County, Indiana
County seats in Indiana
Fort Wayne, IN Metropolitan Statistical Area